The Blackburn Buccaneer is a British low-level attack aircraft that served with the Royal Navy and Royal Air Force (RAF) between 1962 and 1994 and the South African Air Force (SAAF) until 1991.  Three former Royal Aircraft Establishment (RAE) aircraft remain airworthy in South Africa and one is being restored to flight status in the United Kingdom.

Ireland
On display
Buccaneer S2B XX897 is on static display at the Irish National Air Museum, Atlantic Air Venture Park Shannon Airport, Co. Clare in European Airlines colours. Fitted with a Panavia Tornado F2 nosecone and was used to trial the Tornado ADV's Foxhunter radar.

South Africa
Airworthy
Buccaneer S2B ZU-AVI the former Royal Aircraft Establishment XW988 based at Thunder City, Cape Town International Airport.
Stored
Buccaneer S2B ZU-BCR the former Royal Aircraft Establishment XW987 based at Thunder City, Cape Town International Airport.
Buccaneer S2B ZU-NIP the former Royal Aircraft Establishment XW986 based at Thunder City, Cape Town International Airport.
Both of these were flyable but were put for sale although ZU-NIP is still airworthy but ZU-BCR is unfortunately not and will need to be restored.
On display

Buccaneer S50 412 gate guard at AFB Waterkloof, Pretoria.
Buccaneer S50 414 at the SAAF Museum, AFB Swartkop, Pretoria.
Buccaneer S50 416 at the SAAF Museum, AFB Ysterplaat, Cape Town.
Buccaneer S50 421 at the SAAF Museum, AFB Swartkop, Pretoria
Buccaneer S50 422 at National Museum of Military History, Saxonwold, Johannesburg

United Kingdom
On display

Buccaneer S2 XK526 on the gate at Honington Airfield, Suffolk.
Buccaneer S1 XK532 at the Highland Aviation Museum, Inverness Airport, Scotland.
Buccaneer S1 XN923 at the Gatwick Aviation Museum, Surrey.
Buccaneer S1 XN957 at the Fleet Air Arm Museum, Yeovilton, Somerset coded '630'.
Buccaneer S1 XN964 at the Newark Air Museum, Nottinghamshire in Royal Navy markings coded '613'.
Buccaneer S2B XN974 at the Yorkshire Air Museum, Elvington, North Yorkshire.
Buccaneer S2B XT288 at the National Museum of Flight, Scotland.
Buccaneer S2B XV333 at the Fleet Air Arm Museum, Yeovilton, Somerset in the markings of 801 Naval Air Squadron coded '234'.
Buccaneer S2B XV350 at the Aeropark at East Midlands Airport.
Buccaneer S2B XV361 at the Ulster Aviation Society, Lisburn, Northern Ireland.
Buccaneer S2B XV865 in the markings of No. 208 Squadron RAF at the Imperial War Museum Duxford.
Buccaneer S2B XW547 in Gulf War markings coded 'R' at the Royal Air Force Museum, London.
Buccaneer S2B XX889 in the Gulf War marking of No. 208 Squadron RAF and undergoing restoration at Bruntingthorpe Aerodrome, Leicestershire.
Buccaneer S2B XX894 is in taxiable condition at Bruntingthorpe Aerodrome, Leicestershire in the marking of 809 Naval Air Squadron coded '020'.
Buccaneer S2B XX900 is in taxiable condition at Bruntingthorpe Aerodrome, Leicestershire.
Buccaneer S2B XX901 at the Yorkshire Air Museum, Elvington, North Yorkshire in Gulf War pink markings.
Buccaneer S2C XV344 is on display at the gate of the Defence Science and Technology Laboratory at Farnborough Airport.
Buccaneer S2B XX901 is owned by the Buccaneer Aircrew Association, and is on display at the Yorkshire Air Museum.
Buccaneer S2B XW530 is on display outside the Buccaneer Service Station at Elgin, Scotland. Edit. Now on display at Scottish Deer Centre
Buccaneer S2B XW544 is on display and has undergone restoration to full taxiable condition, at Bruntingthorpe Aerodrome, Leicestershire.

Stored or under restoration
NA.39 XK488 is stored at the Fleet Air Arm Museum storage facility at Cobham Hall, Yeovilton, Somerset.
Buccaneer S2B XV168 was held by BAE Systems at Brough Aerodrome, East Yorkshire in No. 12 Squadron RAF markings. It was transferred to the Yorkshire Air Museum in August 2013. 
Buccaneer S2B XV359 is held at a private collection in Devon, England in the markings of 809 Naval Air Squadron coded '035'.
Buccaneer S2B XX885 (registered G-HHAA) is under restoration at the former RAF Scampton, Lincolnshire  and is being rebuilt to flying condition by Hawker Hunter Aviation. It was granted UK CAA permission to fly in April 2006.
Buccaneer S2B XX895 (cockpit section only) is held at a private collection in Oxfordshire.

References

Notes

Bibliography

External links

Home of the Blackburn Buccaneer Society.

Blackburn Buccaneer
Blackburn aircraft